Polycestoides is a genus of beetles in the family Buprestidae, containing the following species:

 Polycestoides chrysis Kerremans, 1902
 Polycestoides nishimawai Toyama, 1985

References

Buprestidae genera